Lorajmine (17-monochloroacetylajmaline) is a drug that is a potent sodium channel blocker (more specifically, a class Ia antiarrhythmic agent) that was used for treating arrhythmia. It is derived from ajmaline, an alkaloid from the roots of Rauvolfia serpentina, by synthetically adding a chloroacetate residue.

References 

Sodium channel blockers
Secondary alcohols
Carboxylate esters
Indole alkaloids